Judge Black may refer to:

Bruce D. Black (born 1947), judge of the United States District Court for the District of New Mexico
Eugene Black (Texas politician) (1879–1975), judge of the United States Board of Tax Appeals
Lloyd Llewellyn Black (1889–1950), judge of the United States District Courts for the Eastern and Western Districts of Washington
Norman William Black (1931–1997), judge of the United States District Court for the Southern District of Texas
Susan H. Black (born 1943), judge of the United States Court of Appeals for the Eleventh Circuit
Timothy Black (born 1953), judge of the United States District Court for the Southern District of Ohio
Walter Evan Black Jr. (1926–2014), judge of the United States District Court for the District of Maryland

See also
Justice Black (disambiguation)